Robert Aramayo (born 6 November 1992) is an English actor. From 2016 to 2017 he played the role of young Eddard Stark in the sixth and seventh season of the HBO series Game of Thrones. In 2021, he starred in the Netflix psychological thriller miniseries, Behind Her Eyes. In 2022 he played Elrond in the Amazon series The Lord of the Rings: The Rings of Power.

Life and career
Aramayo's acting career began at the age of seven when he played the role of Bugsy Malone in a primary school production. When he was ten he joined the Hull Truck Youth Theatre, performing in about three plays a year. His older sister Laura also began an acting career at the Hull Truck Youth Theatre and studied drama at the Oxford School of Drama in Oxford.

He attended Hull's Wyke College and in 2011 won a place at the prestigious Juilliard School in New York City. His performance in a Juilliard production of Anthony Burgess's A Clockwork Orange as Alex, the lead character, earned him his first film role in the Italian-American production Lost in Florence.

From 2016 to 2017 he played the role of young Eddard Stark in the sixth and seventh season of the HBO series Game of Thrones.

Aramayo played the role of mechanical engineer and Harley-Davidson co-founder William S. Harley in the Discovery Channel miniseries Harley and the Davidsons, which premiered September 5–7, 2016, on Discovery. Also that year, he appeared in the Tom Ford film Nocturnal Animals. He has a role in the HBO miniseries Lewis and Clark.

He appeared in The Empty Man, directed by David Prior, The Incident at Sparrow Creek Lumber directed by Henry Dunham, and Eternal Beauty, directed by Craig Roberts.

In August 2019, it was announced that Aramayo had been cast on the Netflix psychological thriller miniseries, Behind Her Eyes.

On 7 January 2020, it was announced that Aramayo had been cast as a character referred to as “Beldor," later revealed to be Elrond in Amazon's television series The Lord of the Rings: The Rings of Power.

Personal life
Born in England, the son of Mike Aramayo, he is of Spanish descent.

Filmography

Film

Television

References

External links

 Juilliard School résumé

1992 births
Living people
English male film actors
English people of Spanish descent
21st-century British male actors
Male actors from Kingston upon Hull
Juilliard School alumni